The Doll Domination Tour was the second concert tour by American girl group The Pussycat Dolls. It was launched in support of their second studio album, Doll Domination (2008). The tour was announced in October 2008 with dates in Europe and Oceania revealed in the following month, the tour contained six legs and 50 shows. It began in Aberdeen, Scotland on January 18, 2009, and concluded in Beirut, Lebanon on July 31, 2009. In-between the first two legs, the group supported the first leg of The Circus Starring Britney Spears in North America. The setlist for the concerts included songs from PCD (2005) and Doll Domination as well a cover of Shirley Bassey's Big Spender. Nineteen shows were submitted to Billboards boxscore grossing $14.3 million, with  231,711 fans attending the performances.

Background 

In August 2008, in an interview with FemaleFirst.co.uk, Ashley Roberts said that their world tour would start January 2009 adding "we're gonna be hitting everywhere around the world and taking over." The tour was officially announced on October 7, 2008. Initial dates were confirmed in the UK with Ne-Yo tapped as a support act. The following month Lady Gaga was announced as an opening act in Europe and in Oceania which marked their first time touring there, while the US shows were to be announced shortly. On December 2, 2008, Britney Spears announced the first leg of twenty-five dates in the US for The Circus Starring Britney Spears with The Pussycat Dolls as the opening act. The tour kicked off on January 18 in Aberdeen, Scotland with the first leg ending in Belgrade, Serbia. Before heading to the Oceania shows, The Pussycat Dolls supported Spears on her tour visiting 27 venues in North America. Following Oceania, they visited Asia and North America and in July they visited England and Ireland for various festivals. Eight weeks before the tour started Jimmy Iovine stated that the group had sold 150,000 out of 160,000.

Development 

The stage screens for the tour were created by Stimulated, Inc. The videos included original design and animation looks for 25 songs. The company spent two months at its Burbank studio creating the visual content for the tour. The opening video sequence of the tour was filmed at a sound stage in Hollywood, California. The group were riding motorcycles against a green screen backdrop. Then, along with The Pussycat Dolls they traveled to Leeds, United Kingdom. Along with Robb Wagner and his team, the Dolls and their creative team, worked hand-in-hand polishing the media content. The Pussycat Dolls spent six days in the Litestructures Studios for a full production rehearsal. The stage was designed by Litestructures. It marked the fourth time that the company worked with The Pussycat Dolls. It measured 32 ft(w) x 24 ft(deep) and 8 ft(tall) – made to fit on 60 ft x 44 ft house stage. It featured includes three custom-built staircases which were made of small aluminium frame with a makrolon top.

The set list of the shows included songs from the standard and deluxe edition of Doll Domination (2008) as well songs from their debut studio album,  PCD (2005). Big Spender by Shirley Bassey was covered by Melody Thornton, as well cover versions of other artists which were used as snippets to songs. During the performances, the group was backed by five male dancers and two percussionists. During the opening leg of the tour, each show was recorded live and then loaded to The Pussycat Dolls wristband that plugs into any USB port or compatible microSD phone. According to Metro The Pussycat Dolls were reportedly planning to make a behind-the-scenes movie about life on their tour. According to an insider, the band had started filming for the movie which was described "as part documentary and part entertainment." Despite this, the documentary never came to fruition. Jessica Sutta suffered a back injury during the first Sydney show, leaving the group performing as a foursome throughout the following shows.

Critical response 

While reviewing the opening concert in Aberdeen, Colene McKessick of The Press and Journal described it as a "roof-raising show." The writer praised the show for its "risque dance moves and infectious energy." She also commended Nicole Scherzinger's ability to carry most of the vocals and was impressed by her bandmates describing them as "talented singers too." Sally Hind of the Evening Express lauded the opening night writing "they came to dominate and that’s what they did." She went on to praise the group's energy, "the five foxy felines didn’t once pause for breath. They were on the move from the minute they appeared on stage on shiny motorbikes until they took their final bow." She also praised the costumes of the show that "kept everyone fixated." Writing for the Evening Times Maureen Ellis described the show as a "high-octane set" whilst noting that even though they "tried to showcase each of the band members in solo sections, it was only ever The Nicole Show." Barbara Hodgson of The Journal described the show as "a solid three hours-plus of pure entertainment." A writer for the Evening Chronicle thought that both Lady Gaga and Ne-Yo raised the standard too high, but went on to praise the group for "somersaulted over it." Lauren Richards of the Birmingham Mail graded it four out five describing it "spectacular, fast paced and great fun." Zoe Kirk of the Nottingham Post commented "this is more than just an ordinary, flimsy girl band; this is the manifestation of some of the best choreographers, beat-makers and catchy pop lyricists the mainstream has to offer." She ended her review writing "This was the Doll Domination their latest album promises." Andy Nicholls of the Bournemouth Echo wrote that "[Scherzinger] may have taken center stage for most of the songs, Ashley, Jessica, Melody and Kimberly all proved they too had star quality." On the contrary to Nicholls, Alex Macpherson from The Guardian felt that the remaining four members "are mere backing singers and dancers" and described Scherzinger as a "revelation, a switched-on, precision-engineered performer." He singled out "I Hate This Part" as the "Dolls' finest moment." Eamon Sweeney of the Irish Independent commented that "despite a dramatic entrance on customized motorbikes, the early segment of the show seems like a massive anti-climax," but later noted that the group "soon get in their stride." He further noted that previous shows at The O2 in Dublin were musically superior, "but few can match this for sheer attitude." A writer for the Belfast Telegraph described the show as "excellent".

For the opening night of the Oceanian leg of the tour in Auckland, New Zealand, Joanna Hunkin of the New Zealand Herald felt that Lady Gaga "group out-sang, outshone and out-sexed the Dolls, in half the time and half the space." Hunkin, who described the group as "poster girls"," criticized the "disappointingly budget set" and the lack of live musicians calling the show as "a glorified karaoke night [...] at the strip club." She concluded her negative review writing the "show proved the Dolls aren't dominating anything." Reviewing the same show, Clio Francis from the Stuff.co.nz agreed with Hunkin praising Gaga for "outshin[ing] the tawdry sexuality of the headliners." He also criticized the basic production while noting the "sound quality throughout their set was mediocre at best, with the over heavy bass at times smothering any passable melodies." However he noted that the night's encore "[brought] the night to a satisfying conclusion for most young fans." Marissa Calligeros from The Sydney Morning Herald echoed previous comments, commending Gaga for "outshin[ing] and outclass[ing] the factory-made act of the headliners." She went to describe the Pussycat Dolls as "a teen dance troupe leading an amateur high school musical production," noting throughout show the audience largely stood motionless, due to the heavy bass. However she did praise Scherzinger's vocals calling them "impressive". Cameron Adams of the Herald Sun praised Gaga's vocal and piano skills whilst criticizing the group for an over-priced concert that looked more as "a shopping center performance than a headline arena show."

In July 2009, Billboard magazine released their Mid-Year List Of Top 25 Tours where data was collected between December 6, 2008 through June 20, 2009, the Pussycat Dolls were listed at number 25 with gross of $14.3 million and 231,711 fans attended the reported 23 shows of which, the twelve were sold-out.

Setlist 
The following setlist was obtained from the concert held on February 24, 2009, at the Incheba Expo Arena in Bratislava, Slovakia. It does not represent all concerts for the duration of the tour.

"Takin' Over the World"
"Beep"
"I Don't Need a Man"
"Elevator"
"I Hate This Part"
"Buttons"
"Wait a Minute"
"Love the Way You Love Me”
"Space" (Thornton solo)
"Played" (Roberts solo)
"Don't Wanna Fall in Love" (Wyatt solo)
"If I Was a Man" (Sutta solo)
"Hush Hush" (Scherzinger solo)
"Big Spender" (Thornton solo)
"Whatcha Think About That"
"Whatchamacallit"
"Magic"
"Bottle Pop"
"Halo" (Scherzinger solo)
"Stickwitu"
Encore
"Don't Cha"
"When I Grow Up"

Shows

Personnel 
Personnel taken from Doll Domination World Tour book.

The Pussycat Dolls

Ashley Roberts
Nicole Scherzinger
Jessica Sutta 
Melody Thornton 
Kimberly Wyatt

Personnel

Robin Antin – artist director, choreographer
Dave Audé – music supervisor
Ramon Baynes – contributing choreographer ("Whatchamacallit")
Kenya Clay – associate choreographer
Misha Gabriel – contributing choreographer ("Halo")
Galen Hooks – contributing choreographer ("Magic")
Mikey Minden – artist director, choreographer
Kenny Wormald – contributing choreographer ("Halo", "Magic", "Played", and "Wait a Minute")

Notes

References 

The Pussycat Dolls concert tours
2009 concert tours

lt:PCD World Tour
ro:PCD Europe Tour